Francis Drake's expedition of 15721573 was an uncommissioned profiteering voyage by Sir Francis Drake in the western and southern quarters of the Caribbean Sea.

Prelude 

Drake's 1571 cruise of the West Indies had proved quite successful, earning him and his crew over £100,000. Consequently, upon his return to Plymouth that year, Drake determined to repeat his feat, assembling, with his brothers John and Joseph, a fleet of two light ships and three small pinnaces (carried in kit form as cargo).

Expedition

Departure 
Drake and company departed Plymouth (aboard the Pascha and Swan) in May 1572, landing in southern Dominica on 29 June. Here, the crew refreshed their provisions, and on 1 July set for Port Pheasant (Zapzurro Cove, 35 leagues west of Tolú), which they reached in 11 days (on 12 July). The following day, Drake was joined by James Raunse and his 30 men.

Cruise

1572

Nombre de Dios 

At Port Pheasant, Drake and Raunse's men built a log fort, so as to allow the carpenters time to assemble Drake's pinnaces.

On 20 July, the pinnaces having been assembled, the DrakeRaunce fleet sail for Isla de Pinos (not Cuban isle), where they surprise two Spanish frigates out of Nombre de Dios. The frigates' (enslaved) sailors furnish the party with fresh intelligence regarding the said port, whereupon Drake (with 53 of his men aboard Drake's three pinnaces) and Raunce (with 20 of his men aboard a Spanish prize shallop) set sail for Nombre de Dios, making landfall in the evening of 29 July.

At 3:00 am that night, the men stole into the port aboard rowboats, but were nonetheless espied by a 60-tonne Spanish merchantman in the harbour. Drake and company managed to land, however, and they took the town's six-gun battery without opposition. They now began dismounting its ordinance, which endeavour stirred the vecinos out of slumber. Upon hearing the warning bells and war drums, Drake and Raunce split their company a dozen men to guard the shore, John Oxenham and 16 others to circle behind the plaza, while Drake led the rest (46 men, with Raunce) noisily up the town's main thoroughfare. In the plaza, the Drake detachment were greeted by 'a jolly hot volley of shot,' but they nevertheless eventually scattered the impromptu militia, and thereby secured the city for themselves. Before the crew could loot the treasury, however, a sudden rainstorm drenched the men's match and gunpowder, and (coincidentally), Drake fainted from loss of blood, having sustained a gunshot during the volley. The fleet hastily retreated to Bastimentos (at dawn, on 30 July).

Spanish Main 
While Drake was recuperating at Bastimentos, Paunce took his leave (on 6 August). Drake (now with only his 73 men) set out upon the Spanish Main, sighting Carthagena by the evening of 13 August. That night, the men seized the Pasha, a 240-tonne merchantman. This was followed by the seizure of two merchant ships the next day. As his crew was now stretched thin across two ships, three pinnaces, and three Spanish prizes, Drake burned one of the prizes, and scuttled the Swan.

Shortly thereafter, the crew set up a camp, christened Port Plenty, in the Gulf of San Blas (ie Darien). From this base, (Francis) Drake and company spend the next five or six weeks raiding settlements along the Main as far east as the Magdalena River, while John Drake endeavoured to befriend the Panamanian cimarrones.

John having cemented an alliance with the cimarrones (by 24 September), the company relocated Port Plenty, and spend the next two weeks fortifying it. On 7 October they were once more cruising off Cartagena. On 17 October, Oxenham and the Swan seized a 50-tonne barque, marooning its 10 men and 5 slaves. On 20 October, the fleet intercepted a 58-tonne and a 12-tonne merchant, likewise stranding their crews. Having noticed the fleet, on 22 October (at dawn), two frigates from Carthagena engaged Drake. They had a difficult time of it, however, the bay proved too vast to corner the Englishmen. Drake's fleet finally quit Carthagena for the Magdalena River on 3 November, their provisions running dangerously low.

The fleet reached Magdalena on 5 November, but found the settlements deserted and the herds withdrawn inland (Spanish authorities having forwarded the vecinos). They continued on to Santa Marta, reaching that town within a week. Here they also found the Spanish prepared, as they were prevented from watering by hidden snipers on shore. They seized a 90 tonne vessel w victuals here on 12 Nov, and detained crew for a day. They next set for Curaçao, landing there on 13 November. A couple of days later, Drake detached Oxenham’s pinnace "Minion" to sail directly back and advise his Panamanian base of his imminent return, while he scoured the Main with his own pinnace and prize. Upon refreshing for a few days, Drake renewed his raids towards the Main, while Oxenham (aboard the Minion) was dispatched to the recently-relocated Port Plenty, to advise the crew there of Drake's upcoming return.

Drake followed Oxenham to Port Plenty within the fortnight. Upon his 27 November arrival, he discovered his brother John had died. Drake now decided to postpone further raids, so as to renew his efforts upon the Panamanian treasure train the coming year. His remaining brother, Joseph, succumbed to a fatal fever that December.

1573

Venta Cruces 
On 30 January, upon cimarron allies' intelligence, the Lion reconnoitred Nombre de Dios, intercepting a Spanish frigate there, which confirmed (the cimarrones''' information) that the Spanish plate fleet had arrived. Consequently, on 3 February, Drake and Oxenham, with 16 Englishmen and 30 cimarrones, trudged through the jungle and over the Cordilleras to intercept the treasure train. On 14 February, the party approached Panama City, whereupon a cimarron in disguise stole into the settlement, returning that evening with news of an upcoming 14-mule treasure train (from Lima, to Nombre de Dios, via Venta de Cruces). The rovers set up an ambush near Venta Cruces (on Chagres River). Robert Pike, a drunken crew-mate, was discovered by a Spanish traveller en route to Venta Cruces, whereupon the treasure train was forestalled. They nonetheless managed to seize a few silver-loaded mules, and make a hasty retreat to Venta Cruces, which they easily occupied for some time, reaching base camp on 22 February.

 Veragua 
Undaunted, Drake determined to cruise off Veragua (aboard the Minion), finally desisting on 19 March, having gained a frigate and its Genoese pilot. In the meantime, Oxenham cruise eastwards (aboard the Bear), where he seized a well-provisioned frigate out of Tolú, heading back to camp by 21 March.

The men celebrated Easter at Port Plenty, on 22 March. The next day, Drake ventured out (aboard his Spanish prize and the Bear). On 25 March, they chanced upon Guillaume Le Testu (and his 70 men aboard an 80-tonne ship), who agrees to join Drake and the cimarrones in an attempt against the treasure train.

 Nombre De Dios 
On 31 March, Drake (with 20 men), Le Testu (with some 20 men), and a number of cimarrones, rendezvous at the mouth of the San Francisco River, from where they advance (this time towards Nombre de Dios) to intercept the treasure train. On the morning of 1 April, the rovers (successfully) ambushed a treasure train of some 160 mules and 45 armed guards. The Spaniards guards engaged the rovers, mortally wounding Le Testu in the process. As their treasure summed nearly 30 tonnes of silver and gold, the surviving crew hid half of the booty before hastily making their escape, planning to recuperate the loot later on. They arrive at the rendezvous point on 3 April, only to find seven Spanish pinnaces at the river's mouth, and none of their own vessels (one prize and two pinnaces, which had been blown off-course some 12 miles by a strong westerly wind). Drake and three 'brave companions' venture out, in a shoddy raft, to retrieve their craft, which they do by nightfall, returning with the Bear and the Minion. The rovers hastily returned to base camp, where the loot was divided and the each contingent parted ways, their enterprise having proved a success.

 Return 
In late April, Drake departed Port Plenty, now with a 30-man crew. The crew provisioned themselves at the Magdalena River (with 250 turtles and a Spanish merchantman). The crew set anchor at Plymouth on 9 August, bringing the expedition to an end.

 Timeline 

 Aftermath 

Drake and company are thought to have profited at least £20,000 altogether. Some of this may have been forwarded to member of the Privy Council, who reportedly secured Drake a pre-emptive pardon for his unauthorised expedition. Drake himself may have use some of his share to buy a property on Notte Street, Plymouth, where he was listed as a merchant in 1576.

In the first half of 1573, the Real Audiencia of Panama stationed 60 soldiers at the Nombre de Dios garrison, to bolster its defence, and further petitioned the Crown 'promptly to take measures necessary to the defence of this coast and kingdom, for it is considered certain that the corsairs who have now left will return in greater force, and it is even said that they announce that they will settle.' Later that year, Spanish authorities in Panama retaliated against Drake's cimarron allies.

The Real Audiencia of Guatemala likewise took steps to better defend its realm, planning 'to settle some Indians in a location [in Golfo Dulce] such that they can send warning if any [pirate] vessels seek to enter.'

 Legacy 

This voyage has been considered Drake's first independent'' expedition, with its final raid on the treasure train deemed 'the most daring attack ever made upon Spanish-American treasure [up to 1573]'.

Drake (or Oxenham) is further reputed as the first Englishman to have sighted the Pacific and Atlantic Oceans from Pedro Mandingo's lookout point, (as Vasco Nuñez de Balboa had done in 1513, purportedly from the same lookout), and the first Englishman to have cruised the Bay of Honduras (and possibly the waters of present-day Belize).

An artisanal rum distillery, named after Pedro Mandinga, was established in Panama City in the late 2010s.

Notes

Citations

References 

 
 
 
 
 
 
 
 
 
 
 
 
 
 
 
 
 
 
 
 
 
 
 
 
 
 
 

Francis Drake
Caribbean Sea
Piracy